WDCX (990 kHz) is a commercial AM radio station licensed to Rochester, New York.  The station airs a brokered religious radio format.  WDCX's license is held by Kimtron, Inc. which is owned by Crawford Broadcasting. WDCX was a sister station to 102.7 WLGZ-FM (which previously occupied the AM 990 frequency).

WDCX and former sister station WLGZ studios and offices are on Browncroft Boulevard in Rochester.  The transmitter is off Clarkson Parma Townline Road in Brockport, New York.

WDCX programming originates from co-owned 99.5 WDCX-FM in Buffalo, New York.  It is also simulcast on 970 WDCZ in Buffalo.  As a brokered time station, nationally known religious leaders pay WDCX for their half hour segments on the station, and appeal to the listeners for contributions.  Hosts on WDCX include Dr. Charles Stanley, Jim Daly, Chuck Swindoll and Jay Sekulow.

History
The station now known as WDCX has its roots in an earlier radio station, on a different frequency. In 1947, WRNY signed on at 680 kHz. It was a low-power (250 watts) daytime-only station because it was on the same clear channel frequency as 25,000–watt CFTR—Toronto, which is only about 100 miles away from Rochester as the crow flies. (Today, CFTR runs 50,000 watts and can be heard in some areas of Rochester.)  WRNY added an FM sister station (FM 97.7, today 97.9 WPXY-FM) primarily to give the station a night signal, but in the 1950s, few listeners had FM radios.  WRNY-FM signed off by 1955.

From 1957 to 1965, WRNY ran a top 40 format, switching to the call sign WRVM ("Rochester's Voice of Music"). In 1965, the top 40 music was gone and in its place was a country music format under a new call sign, WNYR. Country music lasted 22 years on the channel.  A new sister station, WNYR-FM (now WRMM-FM), signed on in 1966, this time becoming permanent. The AM station moved from 680 kHz to 990 kHz in early July 1979, allowing the station to broadcast 24 hours a day. In 1987, as country music became more popular on FM radio, this led to the establishment of 92.5 WBEE-FM.  WNYR lost its advantage to WBEE and gave up on country music.

The station changed call signs, and formats, to adult standards WEZO on June 21, 1988. (That same year, Malrite Communications sold the station to Boston-based Atlantic Ventures.) On February 26, 1990, the station changed its call sign to WRMM, and began simulcasting the FM's adult contemporary format. Then on May 14, 1993, after Atlantic Ventures merged with two other broadcasting companies to form American Radio Systems, WRMM switched to WCMF, and switched to simulcasting their FM namesake's classic rock format; the following year, the AM adopted a sports talk format. On August 1, 1997, after the station was sold from American Radio Systems to its current owner Crawford Communications, it became religious-formatted WDCZ; on December 1, 1999, the call letters changed to WLGZ and the station returned to adult standards. On February 11, 2008, the station's "Legends" format was modified to incorporate more oldies and soft adult contemporary material, and officially moved to sister station WLGZ-FM 102.7 (formerly WRCI "The Light", a Contemporary Christian station). The displaced Christian format is now being broadcast as an additional HD Radio signal on WLGZ.

On May 23, 2008, AM 990 began broadcasting religious programming under the call sign WRCI which was previously assigned to WLGZ-FM prior to February 11, 2008, effectively accomplishing a call sign swap between the AM and FM stations.

On September 1, 2008, the call sign was changed again to WDCX to match with sister station WDCX-FM in Buffalo.

References

External links
FCC History Cards for WDCX

Radio stations established in 1988
Contemporary Christian radio stations in the United States
DCX (AM)